Colin Mudie (11 April 1926-11 March 2020) was an Edinburgh-born yacht designer, author, naval historian, balloonist, and advocate for the handicapped sailor. He studied engineering at Southampton University, before working under yacht designers including Laurent Giles and Uffa Fox. He then set up his own firm.
He received the award of RDI (Royal Designer for Industry) for Small craft/ naval in 1995.

Yachts

Mudie is particularly celebrated for his range of boat designs, including motorsailers, small sailing cruiser/racers, luxury yachts, and tall ships. Among the tall ship designs are examples for crews which include both handicapped and able-bodied crew members.

Motorsailers
Mudie designed the early range of Hardy motorsailers.

Cruiser/racers

Mudie's cruiser/racer yacht designs include:

SUNSPOT - 1972
WING 25 - 1963

Luxury yachts

Mudie designed a number of luxury yachts, including:
Zinat Al-Bihaar  Omani RYS 1988 
Ashena  built by Wadia 2006 
Passionata  built by Astilleros Udondo 1973

Tall ships

The 'Little Brigs' TS Bob Allen and TS Caroline Allen
INS Sudarshini (A77) is a sister ship of INS Tarangini (A75); three-masted commissioned 1997
INS Tarangini (A75) constructed in Goa - design by Colin Mudie, launched 1 December 1995. 
KLD Tunas Samudera training ship, Royal Malaysian Navy -launched in 1989. Colin Mudie also designed a sister ship (the Young Endeavour)
STS Young Endeavour (Australian Young Endeavour Youth Scheme) laid down by Brooke Marine (which became Brooke Yachts during the vessel's construction) Built 1986-1988
STS Lord Nelson for the Jubilee Sailing Trust (JST), launched  1986
TS Royalist Groves and Guttridge, East Cowes, Isle of Wight. launched on 3 August 1971

Replicas

Matthew, a replica of John Cabot's 15th century caravel, the Matthew, 1996. Built at Redcliffe Wharf by the Bristol Classic Boat Company.

Books

Mudie authored several books on boats and their history of development:

Motor Boats and Boating (Littlehampton Book Services Ltd, 1972) 
Power Boats  (Transatlantic Arts, 1976) 
Power Yachts (with Rosemary Mudie) (Adlard Coles Ltd., 1 Jul 1977) 
The Story of the Sailing Ship (with Rosemary Mudie)   (Exeter Books, 1980) 
Advanced Sailboat Cruising Hardcover (with  G.Hales Handford) (Macmillan, 1981) 
The Sailing Ship. A voyage through the ages (ed., with Rosemary Mudie)  (Roydon Publishing Company, 1984) 
Sopranino (with Patrick Ellam) (Sheridan House Inc, 1986) 
Sailing Ships: Designs and Reconstructions of Great Sailing Ships from Ancient Greece to the Present Day  (Bloomsbury Publishing Plc, 2000)

References

British yacht designers
2020 deaths
1926 births